Paul Morchain (27 December 1876 – 26 October 1939) was a French painter. His work was part of the painting event in the art competition at the 1932 Summer Olympics.

References

1876 births
1939 deaths
20th-century French painters
20th-century French male artists
French male painters
Olympic competitors in art competitions
People from Rochefort, Charente-Maritime